"24 Karat Gold" is the fourth single from American singer-songwriter Stevie Nicks' eighth studio album 24 Karat Gold: Songs from the Vault. The single was released on September 23, 2014.

Background
"24 Karat Gold" is a song written and recorded around 1980 during the Bella Donna album sessions. The original 1980 demo features Stevie playing piano with a drum machine and bass. A lyric video to accompany the song as well as the original demo can be found on YouTube.

Personnel
Stevie Nicks – vocals, keyboards
Dave Stewart – guitar
Waddy Wachtel – guitar, backing vocals
Sharon Celani – backing vocals
Lori Nicks – backing vocals
Tom Bukovac – guitar
Michael Rhodes – bass
Chad Cromwell – drums
Lenny Castro – percussion

References

*24 Karat Gold – Liner Notes

External links
stevienicksofficial.com

Stevie Nicks songs
Songs written by Stevie Nicks
1980 songs